Stephen Coglin (14 October 1899 – 1965) was an English professional footballer who played as an inside forward.

References

1899 births
1965 deaths
Footballers from Wolverhampton
English footballers
Association football inside forwards
Moxley White Star F.C. players
Darlaston Town F.C. players
Lichfield City F.C. players
Wednesbury Old Athletic F.C. players
Willenhall F.C. players
Sunderland A.F.C. players
Grimsby Town F.C. players
Notts County F.C. players
Worcester City F.C. players
Hereford United F.C. players
Cannock Town F.C. players
Bromsgrove Rovers F.C. players
Archdales F.C. players
English Football League players